The Edmonton Legislatures were the first professional baseball team in Edmonton, Alberta, Canada.  The Legislatures existed from 1884 to 1907 before becoming known as the Edmonton Grays.

Defunct minor league baseball teams
Defunct baseball teams in Canada
Leg
Baseball teams established in 1884
Sports clubs disestablished in 1907
1884 establishments in the Northwest Territories
1907 disestablishments in Alberta
1884 establishments in Alberta